Wang Zhongsheng (1874 – 2 December 1911) was a Qing dynasty dramatist, official, and revolutionary. He founded the Spring Sun Society, one of China's earliest troupes dedicated to the performance of the modern spoken drama, which came from the west and differed considerably from the traditional Chinese theatre, or Chinese opera.

For his participation in Xinhai revolution, he was executed as a rebel 29 days before the founding of the Republic of China (1912–1949).

References

1874 births
1911 deaths
Qing dynasty dramatists and playwrights
People executed by the Qing dynasty by firearm
People from Shangyu
Chinese revolutionaries
Writers from Shaoxing
Male actors from Shaoxing
Executed people from Zhejiang
Executed Qing dynasty people
20th-century executions by China